Electric fence is a barrier that uses electric shocks to deter animals from crossing a boundary.

Electric Fence may also refer to:

 Electric Fence, a memory debugger
 "Electric Fences", a song by Damon Albarn

See also
 Electric sport fencing